Cristo Rey OKC is a  Roman Catholic, private high school founded by the Roman Catholic Archdiocese of Oklahoma City in 2018 to provide college preparatory education. In conjunction with local businesses, the students' education is subsidized through the work-study model characteristic of schools in the Cristo Rey Network, of which it is a member. Opened on the fall of 2018, the high school is located on the campus of Oklahoma State University–Oklahoma City.

History  
The effort to open Cristo Rey OKC began in the fall of 2015 among members of the Catholic community, with the approval of Archbishop Paul S. Coakley. Local businesses pledged to support the corporate work-study program. With the approval of the Cristo Rey Network, a feasibility study was launched and subsequently the school's opening was set for the fall of 2018 on the campus of Oklahoma State University–Oklahoma City.

References

External links
 Cristo Rey Network

Cristo Rey Network
Educational institutions established in 2018
Catholic secondary schools in Oklahoma
Private high schools in Oklahoma
2018 establishments in Oklahoma
Poverty-related organizations